As of: 19 March 2023.
Last Game: Salford Red Devils vs Wakefield Trinity, 19 March 2023

Key
 Bold shows players still playing in the Super League.
 Italics shows players still playing rugby league but not playing in Super League
 Statistics will include Super League, playoffs, and Super 8's only.

Josh Charnley (2010-2016, 2018-present), Hull KR, Wigan, Warrington, Leigh on 986 points

See also
List of Super League players with 100 or more tries

References

P